Istiadat Pewaris Penjurit-Kepetangan Melayu (Jawi script: استيعادة ڤواريث ڤنجوريت کڤتاڠن ملايو) or formerly known as  Ilmu Persilatan Penjurit-Kepetangan Melayu , shortform IPPM is one of the oldest original known to date Malay martial art form or called 'Silat' in existence which has been heritage from one generation to another. Descended from the first ruler of the Malayapura Kingdom, King Adityawarman whom is also known as Seri Maharaja Diraja which to a later stage sparked the start of Minangkabau history in Pagaruyung Kingdom, Sumatra, Indonesia. These story has been greatly narrated in most of old Malay Literature including in of the most reliable sources to date called Sulalatus al-Salatin (The Genealogy of The Sultans) or better known as The Malay Annals (Malay: Sejarah Melayu). The manuscript begin with the stories of Wan Malini and Wan Empuk whom was presented with 3 adopted princes right after when their rice fields was magically expelling gold. These 3 princes was later mark as the kickstart for the next 3 big empires in Malay Archipelago. Those empires were the Kingdom of Majapahit (Java Island), The Malacca Sultanate (Malay Peninsula) and the Pagaruyung Kingdom (Sumatra, Indonesia) around the 12th century.

According to the studies on Malay old manuscripts and literatures, this form of martial arts called 'Silat' has been practiced from one generation to another since the beginning days of Malacca Sultanate era and made popular by the legendary Malay warrior known as Hang Tuah, Hang Jebat, Hang Kasturi, Hang Lekir and Hang Lekiu whom learned from their grand master Aria Putra (or some called Adi Putra) whom resided in Gunung Ledang; (English: Mount Ophir) in Malacca. In The Epic of Hang Tuah literature, it is stated that these 5 warriors later learned from Aria Putra elder brother whom resided in the mount Wirana Pura in Java Island. During the 15th century, this form of martial arts was later being brought to the State of Perak (one of the states in Malaysia) by Dato' Bendahara Paduka Diraja Megat Terawis, the first installed Prime Minister come 'Admiral' for the state of Perak, in which the legacy was heritage from the falling Malacca Sultanate Empire after the Portuguese conquest in 1511. Sultan Mudzaffar Shah I son of Malacca Sultan Mahmud Shah was at that time installed as the first Sultan for the State of Perak. Today, the only person who bear the full-scale of this form of martial arts is the Grand Master, The Eldest Ajar-Ajar Megat Ainuddin al-Asyuro Ibni Almarhum the late Dato' Megat Mohd Nordin, one of the rightful descendant of Dato' Megat Terawis of Pagaruyung.

Origin 

The silat tradition is mostly oral, having been passed down almost entirely by word of mouth. In the absence of written records, much of its history is known only through myth and archaeological evidence. It is believed that this form of martial arts has been developed during the beginning days of human inhabitant around the developments of Bukit Siguntang Mahameru Kingdom in Palembang, Sumatra. As narrated in the Malay Annals, the beginning of the Malay empire, started with a story of Paduka Demang Lebar Daun and Sang Nila Utama which took place in Batang Musi River. Paduka Demang Lebar Daun was officially styled as the forefather (Mangkubumi) of all the Malay peoples in Malay Archipelago by Sang Nila Utama through their oath. From the Bukit Siguntang Kingdom it has later developed into a full-grown three gigantic empires in Malay Archipelago history. One of them is the Pagaruyung Kingdom under the rule of King Adityawarman around the 12th century.

As mentioned by Professor Dr. Buya Hamka in his historical book entitled Islam and the Minangkabau Culture, King Adityawarman was bought into Islam in the hands of Sheikh Abdullah Ariff or in the Kedah Tua Kingdom, the saint was known as Sheikh Abdullah al Qumairi, whom are one of the religious student to Muslim made famous saint, Shiekh Abdul-Qadir Gilani who resided in Baghdad, Iraq. According to scholars' studies, Sheikh Abdullah was among the first few Arabs to travel to the Malay Archipelago area in the 12th century. This affair later became a trend which attracted more and more Muslim scholars and saints to travel to the Malay Archipelago area including members of the holy house for the Islamic prophet Muhammad or better known as Ahlul Bayt. Most of them later did find their settlement here. One of the most famous saint among them is Sheikh Sunan Maulana Ishak or better known among the Malays as Wali Solo. From there, it is said that the form of martial arts carried by King Adityawarman has developed and enhanced with Islamic beliefs and rituals among its traditions. The king himself has left many great descendant from his bloodline which include:
 Megat Dewa
 Megat Alam Melintang
 Megat Alang Dilaut
 Megat Panji Alam
 Megat Kembar Ali
 Raden Mahmud
 Megat Seri Rama

While among the Princess side was:
 Tun Hamzah
 Tun Fatah

History of IPPM 

As the first Prime Minister for the State of Perak, Dato' Megat Terawis and his descendants was responsible in the matter of the king palace cultural events, its flow of authorities and the work of ministry of defends which he heritage it from the Palace of Pagaruyung and the Malacca Sultanate Empire (before the invasion of Portuguese in 1511). This has been served as his fate from the forefather of Mangkubumi Bukit Siguntang Mahameru generation after generation. The same culture and adaptation has been used in the palace of Negeri Sembilan, palace of Terengganu, palace of the Malacca Sultanate beside palace of Perak Darul Ridzuan very own. This ethics, code of honor and the way of the warriors has been passed along his generations until the Grand Master Megat Ainuddin Ibni Allahyarham Dato' Megat Mohd Nordin.

As told by the Grand Master himself, he has learned and received this form of martial arts (beside Islamic study) with many of other Grand Master before his time. And according to the old Grand Master through written and verbal notice, Megat Ainuddin was the only student who has graduated. He was later installed as 'Leader of the Ring' and along the few years ahead, he was acknowledged as 'The Eldest Ajar-Ajar' (Guru) by all of his Grand Master. Among all of his Grand Master that has recognized and acknowledge him as the Eldest Ajar-Ajar are;

Imam Haji Megat Sabran Mecca Matyr
Imam Haji Megat Abdul Rauf al-Rijalul'ulghaibi
Kiyai Tok Muslim Pertapa Solok Slim
Kiyai Fakeh Lodin
Pak Pa'ad
Sheikh Othman
Tok Janggut Abdul Razak
Megat Hussein
Awang Misai Besi
Yeop Megat
Hassan
Tun Ali

The Royalties and Palace Recognition 

IPPM is the sole and only Malay martial arts organizations that has been recognized by the Royalties Palaces today. Not only a recognition, but IPPM was given the 'Warriors' mandate by the palaces of Malay Sultanate whom acting as one of the bodies that govern Malay cultural events and its code of ethics. Among the Royalties who has recognized and acknowledge IPPM with certificates and black & white letters which has been signed by the Sultans are:

DYMM Yang Di Pertuan Besar Negeri Sembilan, Tuanku Muhriz Ibni Almarhum Tuanku Munawir of Negeri Sembilan
Tengku Panglima Diraja, YAM Tengku Sulaiman Shah Ibni Sultan Salahuddin Abdul Aziz Shah - Palace of the State of Selangor Darul Ehsan
Panglima Istana Diraja Hilir Bergelar, YM Raja Idris Ibni Raja Mahmud – Palace of the State of Perak Darul Ridzuan
Panglima Pewaris Tun Saban, Tuan Meor Roslan Bergelar Bin YAB Dato’ Seri Meor Rashidi – Palace of the State of Perak Darul Ridzuan
Pewaris Kehormat YAB Tan Sri Dato’ Seri Megat Najmuddin Bin Dato’ Seri Megat Khas – Perak Darul Ridzuan
Pewaris Kehormat YBhg. Dr. Ahmad Al Hatta; Luak Bung Hatta – Perak Darul Ridzuan & The Minangkabau Kingdom.
YM Dato’ Mangkubumi Shahrin Kamarulzaman Al-Rajapati Panji DiRaja Sungai Ujong – Negeri Sembilan Darul Khusus
Today, IPPM is officially recognized as one of the registered organization under the Malaysian Organizations Law and ROC} with the mandate of 'Malay Sultanate Palaces Warriors' given by the Supreme Court of Malaysia. This acknowledgements and recognition has taken IPPM back to their glorious days of 'Malay Warriors' just like 500 years ago in the time of Dato' Laksamana Hang Tuah during the Malacca Sultanate era and Orangkaya Bendahara Paduka Raja Megat Terawis in the time of Sultan Muzaffar Shah I Ibni Almarhum Sultan Mahmud Shah of Perak.

The Arts of Penjurit Kepetangan 

As the norm of many other form of martial arts, so did as Penjurit Kepetangan encouraging and enforcing its members towards the healthy and harmony life style. The needs of meditation is mandatory to all members of IPPM in order to get closer to God and nature. Beside of meditations, members are as well been encouraged to sparring or duel techniques called 'Belebat' (Malay: Tempur) on different surface and levels. These are parts of the learning techniques and process that have to go through for all members to master their own self and fighting techniques. Beside fighting techniques, there are dedicated fighting form called 'Dabat'. All of the forms of Dabat in Penjurit Kepetangan is based and taken from natures being around themselves. These are:  

Cengkau Taji Beroga
Kecamuk Lang Segara
Badai Mencak Kelambit
Belalak Jampuk Aru-Aru
Karang Jeraus Keruh
Gusar Harimau Akar
Kudrat Alam Adikara

Galleries

Notes

References 
Senaman Silat Jiwa Sihat - Megat Ainuddin al-Asyuro & Professor Madya Dr. Nor Anita Megat Mohd Nordin   - Published by Al Ameen Serve Holdings Sdn. Bhd., Kuala Lumpur, 2005
Senaman Silat Wanita - Megat Ainuddin al-Asyuro & Professor Madya Dr. Nor Anita Megat Mohd Nordin   - Published by Al Ameen Serve Holdings Sdn. Bhd., Kuala Lumpur, 2009
Sulalatus Salatin - Compiled by Tun Sri Lanang and recited by A. Samad Ahmad - Dewan Bahasa & Pustaka (DBP) publishing, 1977 from the collections copy of Raja Bongsu; MS. 18 Sir Stamford Raffles; Singapore; 1953
Islam dan Adat Minangkabau - Professor Dr. Buya Hamka; ; Pustaka Panjimas; Jakarta; 1984
Sejarah Umat Islam; Volume 1, 2 & 3 - Professor Dr. Buya Hamka; ; Pustaka Nasional Pte. Ltd.; Singapore; 1997
Tuhfat al Nafis - Raja Ali Haji; ; ; Published by Yayasan Karyawan ; Kuala Lumpur & Riau; from original manuscript dated 1885
Ryukyuan Relations with Korea and South Sea Countries: An Annotated Translation of Documents in the Rekidai Hōan; -  Mitsugu Matsuda; OCLC 221947347; Kyoto; Japan; 1969
Suma Oriental (An Account of the East, from the Red Sea to China, Written in Malacca and India in 1512-1515) - Author Tomé Pires; and editing by Armando Cortesão; Laurier Books Ltd.: Asian Educational Services; Lisbon, India & Malacca; 1512 - 1515

External links 
Salam Penjuritan Official
Penjurit Kepetangan Photo Blog
Penjurit Kepetangan Official Facebook Page
Penjurit Kepetangan on Silat Melayu Community
Kemega
Kemega Maya
Persatuan Megat Terawis Malaysia
 (Tunku Daeng) Tun Farul Azri 
Penjurit 313

Silat
Minangkabau
Martial arts of the Malay archipelago